Brian Ashley Dobson (born 1 March 1934) is an English former footballer who played as a defender in the Football League for Colchester United.

Career

After joining hometown club Colchester United as an apprentice, Dobson made his first-team debut for the club in a 1–0 away defeat to Aldershot on 24 March 1956. He made 24 appearances in the Football League for the U's between 1956 and 1959, with his final game coming on 7 November 1959, a 2–1 victory at Layer Road against Newport County. He later moved to Clacton Town.

References

1934 births
Living people
Sportspeople from Colchester
English footballers
Association football defenders
Colchester United F.C. players
F.C. Clacton players
English Football League players